Ioannis or Ioannes, shortened to Giannis or Yannis (Γιάννης) is a Greek given name cognate with Johannes and John and the Arabic name Yahya . Notable people with the name include:
Ioannis I, Tzimiskis, Byzantine Emperor
Ioannis Agorastos-Plagis (John Plagis), Southern Rhodesian flying ace during World War II
Ioannis Alevras, Greek politician who served as Speaker of the Hellenic Parliament
Ioannis Altamouras, Greek painter of the 19th century
Ioannis Anastassakis, professionally known as John Aniston, a Greek-born American actor
Ioannis Andrianopoulos, Greek footballer and one of the founding members of football club Olympiacos CFP 
Ioannis Antetokounmpo, commonly known as Giannis Antetokounmpo, Greek basketball player
Ioannis Apakas, Greek painter and priest in the latter part of the 16th century to the early 17th century
Ioannis Argyropoulos, a lecturer, philosopher and humanist, one of the émigré Greek scholars who pioneered the revival of classical Greek learning in 15th-century Italy
Ioannis Bourousis, Greek basketball player and member of Greece men's national basketball team that won the gold medal at EuroBasket 2005
Ioannis Celivergos Zachos, Greek-American physician, literary scholar, elocutionist, author, lecturer, inventor, and educational pioneer
Ioannis Chalkeus, a scholar, philosopher and figure of the modern Greek Enlightenment in the 18th century
Ioannis Chryssomallis, known professionally as Yanni, a Greek-American composer, keyboardist, pianist, and music producer
Ioannis Dalianidis, Greek film director
Ioannis Demestichas, Greek Navy officer, known for his participation in the Macedonian Struggle under the nom de guerre of Kapetan Nikiforos
Ioannis Doukas, Greek painter and one of the main representatives of the so-called 'Greek Munich School'
Ioannis Dullardi, Flemish philosopher and logician
Ioannis Filimon, 19th-century Greek historian, militant journalist and publisher
Ioannis Frangoudis, Greek Army officer and athlete, who competed in the 1896 Summer Olympics in Athens as a shooter and became the only Greek athlete to win a gold, a silver and a bronze medal in a single Olympic
Ioannis Gennadios, Greek diplomat, writer, and speaker, best known for his donation of his collection of Greek books and art to the Gennadius Library
Ioannis Hadji Argyris, Greek pioneer of computer applications in science and engineering
Ioannis Ioannidis, Greek basketball player, professional basketball coach, and politician
Ioannis Kakridis (1901–1992), Greek classical scholar
Ioannis Kalatzis, Greek singer
Ioannis Kaminiates, Byzantine writer of the 10th century
Ioannis Kapodistrias (John Capodistrias), Greek politician who served as the Foreign Minister of the Russian Empire and the first head of state of independent Greece
Ioannis Karatzas, Phanariote Greek Prince of Wallachia
Ioannis Kasoulidis, Cypriot politician
Ioannis Kolettis (1773–1847), Greek politician who served as Prime Minister of Greece
Ioannis Makriyannis, born Ioannis Triantaphyllou, Greek merchant, military officer, politician and author, best known today for his Memoirs
Ioannis Metaxas, Greek general and politician
Ioannis Okkas, Cypriot football player
Ioannis Pangas, Greek philanthropist and businessman
Ioannis Paraskevopoulos, Greek banker and politician
Ioannis Rallis, Greek politician
Ioannis Samaras, Greek footballer
Ioannis Smaragdis, Greek film director
Ioannis Svoronos, Greek archaeologist and numismatist
Ioannis Theofilakis, Greek shooter
Ioannis Theotokis (1880–1961), Greek politician who became Prime Minister of Greece
Ioannis Topalidis, Greek professional football manager and former player, assistant manager of the Greece national football team winning the UEFA Euro 2004 championship
Ioannis Tsarouchis, Greek modernist painter and set designer
Ioannis Varvakis, member of the Filiki Eteria and benefactor
Ioannis Vratsistas, cyber security analyst also known as Voskos- Shepard which is a constant reminder that if they fail in cyber security his future will be sheep Shepard.
Ioannis Varoufakis, commonly known as Yanis Varoufakis, Greek-Australian economist and politician
Ioannis Veliotes, commonly known as Johnny Otis, an American singer, musician, composer, arranger, bandleader, talent scout, disc jockey, record producer, television show host, artist, author, journalist, minister, and impresario
Ioannis Xenakis, Greek-French avant-garde composer, music theorist, architect, performance director and engineer

See also

Agios Ioannis Rentis, Athens, Greece
Iohannis
Joannis
Yannis
Alternate forms for the name John

Greek masculine given names